George Gerster (April 30, 1928 – February 8, 2019) was a Swiss journalist and a pioneer aerial photographer.

Early life 
Born in Winterthur, in 1950 Gerster earned a doctorate at the University of Zurich in Germanistik. Through 1956 he worked as an editor for the inhabitants of Zurich's "World Week". Since then he has been active as a freelance journalist with an emphasis on science reporting and flight photography.

In this photographic field of activity he did substantial pioneer work in the 1950s and 1960s, respected not only for the technology and quality of his flight pictures, but above all for the universality and internationality of the topics.

Gerster's early photographic reportage and picture volumes detailed landscapes of North Africa. In the sixties he documented places of archaeological interest in over 100 countries on all continents. In addition, he took breath-taking pictures of mountains and deserts, coasts and lakes, agrarian and industrial landscapes.

George Gerster was honored in 1976 with the Prix Nadar. His photos have been shown in single and group exhibitions in Europe, Japan and the USA. He was represented by the Rapho photo agency.

Gerster emphasizes, on the one hand, the beauty of the landscape; on the other hand he points out the endangerment to nature caused by excessive use, erosion, technology and mechanization. The fact that he does not only want to make "beautiful pictures" shows in his expert and precisely investigated captions and book texts.

Publications
 L'art éthiopien, églises rupestres, éditions Zodiaque (1968)
 Der Mensch auf seiner Erde, Zürich: Atlantis Verlag (1975)
 Flights of discovery: The Earth from Above, Paddington Press Ltd. (1978)
 The Past from Above: Aerial Photographs of Archaeological Sites. Los Angeles:  Getty Publications, 2005.  Pp. 416; ills. 516. 
 The Art of the Maze, with Adrian Fisher, Weidenfeld & Nicolson (1990), 
 Paradise Lost: Persia from Above, Phaidon, 2009 (photos made between 1976 and 1978)

See also
 Yann Arthus-Bertrand

References

External links
 Official website, English version
 Iran: A bird's eye view. A 2008 exhibition at the Dutch National Museum of Antiquities (Rijksmuseum van Oudheden). Accessed Dec 2, 2014.
  Review of The Past from Above. A 2006 exhibition at the British Museum . Accessed Dec 2, 2014.

1928 births
2019 deaths
Swiss photographers
Aerial photographers
People from Winterthur
Remote sensing archaeologists
University of Zurich alumni